Fiend for Blood is an EP by Autopsy released in 1991 on Peaceville Records. The whole of this release is available as bonus tracks on the 2003 version of Acts of the Unspeakable. It is also included on the 2012 compilation album All Tomorrow's Funerals.

Track listing

Personnel
Autopsy
Chris Reifert - Vocals, Drums 
Danny Coralles - Guitar 
Eric Cutler - Guitar
Steve DiGiorgio - Bass

Production
 Recorded and mixed September 20 – 21, 1991 at Starlight Sound, Richmond, California, USA
 Produced by Autopsy
 Engineered by Bill Thompson
 Cover art by John Chandler

Autopsy (band) albums
1991 EPs